Laura is a hamlet in Montrose Rural Municipality 315, Saskatchewan, Canada. It previously held the status of village until December 31, 1954 and again at an unknown date but was restructured back to hamlet status on December 28, 1978. The hamlet is located southwest of Saskatoon along Highway 7 and Canadian National Railway Saskatoon-Rosetown stub. Prior to the Great Depression, Laura was a bustling active pioneer farming community.

History
Prior to December 31, 1954, Laura was incorporated as a village, and was restructured as a hamlet under the jurisdiction of the Rural Municipality of Montrose on that date. The hamlet was incorporated under village status at an unknown date. That status was again taken over by the jurisdiction of the Rural Municipality of Montrose on December 28, 1978.

Notable people

 Hazel Annie Page
 William C. Macklon

See also

 List of communities in Saskatchewan
 Hamlets of Saskatchewan

References

Montrose No. 315, Saskatchewan
Former villages in Saskatchewan
Unincorporated communities in Saskatchewan
Ghost towns in Saskatchewan
Populated places disestablished in 1978